Sarah E. Zabel (born July 9, 1965, in Los Angeles, California) is a retired United States Air Force general and former vice director of the US Defense Information Systems Agency (DISA) where she managed a federal agency of 16,000 military, civilian and contract personnel. Her principal mission was to plan, develop, deliver and operate command and control capabilities and a global enterprise infrastructure in direct support of the president, the secretary of defense, the Joint Chiefs of Staff, the combatant commanders, the Department of Defense components and other mission partners across the full spectrum of operations.

Afterwards she became the director of the Information Technology Acquisition Process Development, Office of the US Air Force dedicated to Acquisition, Technology and Logistics. In this role, she devises and implements strategies to responsively deliver IT capabilities across the departments of the Air Force.

At the end of 2018, she retired.

Education 
Sarah E. Zabel earned her commission from the U.S Air Force Academy in 1987, graduating with a bachelor's degree in computer science. She then graduated of a Master of Science in computer science at the University of Texas at San Antonio in 1996, a Master of Military Operational Art and Science at the Air Command and Staff College in Maxwell AFB (Alabama) in 2001, and another Master of Strategic Studies at the U.S. Army War College in Carlisle, Pennsylvania in 2007.

Distinction

Major awards and decorations 

 Distinguished Service Medal
 Defense Superior Service Medal with oak leaf cluster
 Legion of Merit Medal with oak leaf cluster
 Bronze Star Medal
 Defense Meritorious Service Medal with oak leaf cluster
 Meritorious Service Medal with five oak leaf clusters
 Joint Service Commendation Medal
 Air Force Commendation Medal
 Air Force Achievement Medal
 Joint Meritorious Unit Award with oak leaf cluster
 Air Force Outstanding Unit Award
 Air Force Organizational Excellence Award with oak leaf cluster
 National Defense Service Medal

Achievements 

 1987 Outstanding Cadet in Computer Science, U.S. Air Force Academy, Colorado
 2000 Outstanding Academy Educator, Department of Computer Science, U.S. Air Force Academy, Colorado
 2007 Commandant's Award for Distinction in Research, U.S. Army War College, Carlisle Barracks, Pennsylvania
 2015 Certified Information Systems Security Professional

Promotions 

 Second Lieutenant May 27, 1987
 First Lieutenant May 27, 1989
 Captain May 27, 1991
 Major Nov. 1, 1998
 Lieutenant Colonel Feb. 1, 2003
 Colonel Sept. 1, 2007
 Brigadier General June 4, 2013
 Major General Nov 2, 2015

Publication 
 “The Military Strategy of Global Jihad,” Strategic Studies Institute, 2007

References 

1965 births
Living people
United States Air Force generals
United States Air Force Academy alumni
University of Texas at San Antonio alumni